Rezh is a town and the administrative center of Rezhevsky District in Sverdlovsk Oblast, Russia, located on the river Rezh (Ob's basin),  northeast of Yekaterinburg, the administrative center of the oblast. As of the 2010 Census, its population was 38,215.

History
It was founded in 1773 as a settlement around a metal works factory. Town status was granted to it in 1943.

Administrative and municipal status
Within the framework of administrative divisions, Rezh serves as the administrative center of Rezhevsky District. As an administrative division, it is incorporated within Rezhevsky District as the Town of Rezh. As a municipal division, the town of Rezh is, together with all thirty rural localities in Rezhevsky District, incorporated as Rezhevskoy Urban Okrug.

References

Notes

Sources

Cities and towns in Sverdlovsk Oblast
Yekaterinburgsky Uyezd